Omkar Shekhar Otari (born 16 December 1987) is an Indian Weightlifter, who won Bronze medal in the men's 69 kg weight class at the 2014 Commonwealth Games at Glasgow, Scotland. He hails from Kolhapur. He also participated at the 2010 Commonwealth Games in the 62 kg event.

Major competitions

References

Living people
Indian male weightlifters
Weightlifters at the 2010 Asian Games
1987 births
Commonwealth Games medallists in weightlifting
Weightlifters at the 2014 Commonwealth Games
Commonwealth Games bronze medallists for India
Asian Games competitors for India
21st-century Indian people
Medallists at the 2014 Commonwealth Games